The Ballshi inscription is an epigraph from the time of the Bulgarian Prince (Knyaz) Boris I (852–889) testifying to the christianization of Bulgaria. The inscription was unearthed near Ballshi, Albania, in 1918.

The Medieval Greek–language Bulgarian inscription covers the upper part of a marble column which also features, in its bottom part, the later Latin epitaph of Norman commander Robert de Montfort who died in 1108, with a cross in the middle of the column. The column was discovered by Austro-Hungarian soldiers during World War I 25 kilometres southwest of the Albanian town of Berat, near Ballshi, among the ruins of a monastery.

The Ballshi inscription is a key domestic source giving important information about the Christianization of the Bulgarians and the location of the southwestern border of the First Bulgarian Empire and the region of Kutmichevitsa during the rule of Boris. Saint Clement of Ohrid's concise biography by Demetrios Chomatenos, early 13th-century Archbishop of Ohrid, hints at the existence of other similar stone columns in the region of Gllavenica, notifying of the baptism of the Bulgarians. Chomatenos even attributes their construction to Clement:

The current location of the inscription is not known. In the first half of the 20th century it was exhibited in a museum in Durrës. The National Archaeological Museum in Sofia preserves a plaster print of the epigraph.

Text

See also
 Christianization of Bulgaria
 Bulgarians in Albania

References

 
 
 
 
 

9th century in Bulgaria
9th-century inscriptions
9th-century Christian texts
Medieval inscriptions
865
866
Bulgarian Greek inscriptions
Medieval Latin inscriptions
Medieval Christian inscriptions
Kutmichevitsa
Christianization of Europe
1918 archaeological discoveries
1918 in Albania